A Town and Two Cities is the debut album by English alternative rock band Your Vegas. The album was produced by David Bendeth and mixed by Brian Sperber.

Background
The album's title is a reference to the band's home town of Otley, their home city of Leeds and the city in which they were based (at the time of the album's release), New York.

Release and reception
A Town and Two Cities was released digitally in the United States on Universal Republic Records on 1 April 2008 and in stores nationwide on 29 April 2008.  The lead single "In My Head" spent 13 weeks at number 1 on Alt Nation.  The album was voted number six in Music Under Fire's top 30 albums of 2008. It was well received by critics and music fans alike, with an average rating of five stars on Amazon.com and four-and-a-half stars on iTunes.

Track listing

Personnel

Your Vegas
 Coyle Girelli – vocals, guitar, keys
 Mat Steel – guitar
 Jon Langford – bass guitar
 Mark Heaton – keys, guitar
 Mal Taylor – drums

Production
 David Bendeth – Producer, Percussion
 Dan Korneff – Engineering, Digital Editing
 Jon Bender – Engineering, Digital Editing
 Kato Khandwala – Engineering, Digital Editing, Programming
 John Tomaszewski – Assistant
 Kyle Cadena – Assistant
 Brian Sperber – Mixer
 Noah Goldstein – Mix Assistant
 Charlie Stavish – Mix Assistant
 Tony Gillis – Mastering

References

External links

Official Your Vegas Myspace Page
Official Your Vegas YouTube channel
Official Your Vegas Network
Your Vegas Fan Site
Your Vegas at reverbnation
Your Vegas at purevolume

2008 debut albums
Your Vegas albums
Universal Republic Records albums
Albums produced by David Bendeth